Haatland is the fourth album by Dutch thrash metal band Dead Head, released in 2005. The album was produced by Jacob Hansen at Hansen Studios in Ribe, Denmark.

Track listing

Personnel
 Tom van Dijk – bass guitar, vocals
 Robbie Woning – guitar
 Ronnie van der Wey – guitar
 Hans Spijker – drums

References 

Dead Head albums
1991 albums
Albums produced by Jacob Hansen